"Too Cold" is a 2005 single by British rapper Roots Manuva. It was released as a single from Awfully Deep. It peaked at number 39 on the UK Singles Chart. Prefix magazine characterized the track for its "plodding gothic beat and sing-along self-inflective chorus". The song's string-laced production has been compared to a "West End musical".

Track listing

Charts

References

External links
 

2004 songs
2005 singles
Roots Manuva songs